In modern times, numerous impact events on Mars have been detected. Although most have been inferred from the appearance of new impact craters on the planet, some have corresponded to marsquakes felt by the InSight lander. To date, no impacting meteors have been directly observed as a fireball or discovered in space before impact.

As the best-explored planet in the Solar System (after Earth), Mars has been continuously explored by various spacecraft, landers, and rovers since 1997. The first probe to image Mars's surface in detail was Mariner 4 in 1965, and Mariner 9 became the first probe to orbit Mars in 1971. From 1976 to 1982, Viking 1 and Viking 2 imaged all of Mars at  resolution, with some areas imaged in up to  resolution.

The first detected impact, a -diameter crater in southern Lucus Planum, happened between 27 January 2000, and 19 March 2001. Since then, over 1,200 new impact craters have been found on Mars with 2001 Mars Odyssey, Mars Express, and Mars Reconnaissance Orbiter, over 1,100 of which were found by the last.

Unlike on Earth, most impact craters on Mars come in clusters, caused by the meteor partially fragmenting before impact.

There is significant observation bias in the locations of discovered impact craters: certain locations on Mars are of much more geological interest, and so are imaged more frequently and in detail than less notable ones. Additionally, many new craters are first noticed by their 'blast zone' of ejecta, which can be 10-100 times the size of the crater itself. However, only certain regions of Mars have subsurface material that can be ejected to create these features; in particular, the Tharsis rise, Olympus Mons, Elysium Mons, and Arabia Terra. As a result, very few impacts have been detected outside of these regions, despite impacts in theory happening randomly across the planet.

Despite these biases, the existing observations of new Martian impacts suggest that asteroids of a given size impacting the planet are about 3 times more common than on Earth and the Moon, with roughly 240  craters and one to seven  craters forming each year (compared to the observed ~0.8). Larger impactors also seem to be more relatively frequent than on Earth or the Moon (i.e. the size-frequency distribution slope is shallower). If this holds true for larger asteroid sizes, this suggests that Mars may be in a modern impact surge, although atmospheric deceleration of small asteroids might explain the unexpectedly shallow slope, which would become more consistent with predictions for larger asteroids.

List of notable impacts
The following is a list of detected impact events with a crater size of >15 meters, which excludes most meteoroid impacts (<1 meter asteroids). 10-15 meter craters discovered before 2010 are also included, before the rate of discovering such craters became dozens per year.

Notes

See also
 Impact event
 Impact events on Jupiter
 Marsquake

References

Impact events
Geology of Mars
Mars